Minttu Mustakallio (born 23 July 1973) is a Finnish actress. Born in Ylivieska, Finland to a Greek father and Finnish mother, she has acted in many Finnish TV dramas and several feature films. She won a Jussi Award in 2005 as Best Supporting Actress in Producing Adults and in 2012 she won a Golden Venla award. She also worked as a writer for the television comedy series Ugrilampaat in 1999.

Partial filmography 
 Producing Adults (Lapsia ja aikuisia, 2004)
 Soap (Saippuaprinssi, 2006)
 Ganes (2007)
 Playing Solo (Sooloilua, 2007)
 If You Love (Jos rakastat, 2010)
 The Storage (2011)

References

Finnish actresses
1973 births
Living people
People from Ylivieska

Finnish people of Greek descent